Lawrence Robert Dowler (born February 20, 1954) is an American former competition swimmer who participated in the 1976 Summer Olympics in Montreal, Quebec.  He competed in the 100-meter breaststroke, and advanced to the event semifinals.

References

1954 births
Living people
American male breaststroke swimmers
Olympic swimmers of the United States
Swimmers at the 1975 Pan American Games
Swimmers at the 1976 Summer Olympics
Pan American Games silver medalists for the United States
Pan American Games medalists in swimming
Medalists at the 1975 Pan American Games